Fordiophyton are a genus of flowering plants in the family Melastomataceae, native to Vietnam and southern China.

Species
Species currently accepted by The Plant List are as follows: 
Fordiophyton brevicaule C. Chen
Fordiophyton breviscapum (C. Chen) Y.F. Deng & T.L. Wu
Fordiophyton cordifolium C.Y. Wu ex C. Chen
Fordiophyton degeneratum (C. Chen) Y.F. Deng & T.L. Wu
Fordiophyton faberi Stapf
Fordiophyton longipes Y.C. Huang ex C. Chen
Fordiophyton peperomiifolium (Oliv.) C. Hansen
Fordiophyton repens Y.C. Huang ex C. Chen
Fordiophyton strictum Diels

References

Melastomataceae genera